Vungzagin Valte is an Indian politician and member of the Bharatiya Janata Party. Valte is a member of the Manipur Legislative Assembly from the Thanlon constituency in Pherzawl district as an Indian National Congress.

References 

People from Churachandpur district
Bharatiya Janata Party politicians from Manipur
Manipur MLAs 2017–2022
Living people
Manipur politicians
21st-century Indian politicians
Year of birth missing (living people)
Manipur MLAs 2022–2027